Barbie Shanghai was the first Mattel Barbie flagship store in the world. Located in Shanghai, China, this  store held the world's largest and most comprehensive collection of Barbie dolls and licensed Barbie products. It ceased activities in March 2011.

Construction
Mattel worked with BIG, the branding and design division of Ogilvy & Mather, to develop the creative concept, identify a location, explore featured activities and identify partners. Slade Architecture led the design including the exterior, interior, fixtures and furnishings.

Services

Spa treatments, hair and nail services, and skincare products were available. The Design Center allowed girls to become a fashion designer in a 30-minute experience of the steps of the design process (inspiration, concept, prototypes, fabrics etc.). In the end, girls could sit down at a computer to create their own doll. In the Fashion Runway, girls could experience a runway show by getting dressed in fashions from world-renowned designers. The Barbie Cafe was a collaboration with Australian celebrity chef David Laris. The bar had karaoke, a DJ, and pink martinis, known as Barbietinis. Barbie chocolates were available, also created by the Australian celebrity chef David Laris.

References

External links

 

Shanghai
Buildings and structures in Shanghai
Companies based in Shanghai
Defunct retail companies of China
Mattel
Retail companies disestablished in 2011
Retail companies established in 2009
Chinese companies disestablished in 2011
Chinese companies established in 2009